Zweifel's frog (Lithobates zweifeli) is an amphibian species endemic to Mexico. It is a member of the true frog family, Ranidae.

Etymology
The specific name, zweifeli, honors American herpetologist Richard G. Zweifel.

Habitat
The natural habitats of L. zweifeli are tropical seasonal forests at low elevations. It is found near water, for example streams, rivers and permanent and temporary ponds, its breeding habitat.

Conservation status
L. zweifeli is not considered threatened by the IUCN, although disturbance and desiccation of the water systems remains a threat.

References

Lithobates
Amphibians described in 1984
Taxa named by Robert G. Webb
Endemic amphibians of Mexico
Taxonomy articles created by Polbot
Balsas dry forests